Mampava bipunctella, the foxtail millet webworm, is a species of snout moth, and the type species in the genus Mampava. It was described by Émile Louis Ragonot in 1888, and is known from India, Papua New Guinea, Malaysia (Sarawak), Taiwan, China, the Moluccas, Indonesia (Java, Borneo) and Japan.

The larvae feed on sorghum and corn.

References 

Moths described in 1888
Tirathabini
Moths of Japan
Taxa named by Émile Louis Ragonot